The Świętokrzyski Bridge is a bridge over the Vistula river in Warsaw, Poland linking Powiśle neighbourhood with Praga Północ district.

It is a cable-stayed bridge, 479 m long, with two lanes for vehicles, a pavement and a cycle path each way. The single tower, 90 m high, located on the right (eastern) river bank, has 48 cables attached supporting the deck.  Near the left (western) bank the bridge is supported by two piers.
The bridge was opened on 6 October 2000 after two years' construction.

The bridge's name comes from Świętokrzyska Street, which forms part of the access route from the city centre.

According to the data from Stołecznego Zarządu Dróg Miejskich (Capital City Road Authority) in 2018, on average 23,418 vehicles passed the Świętokrzyski Bridge daily.

Gallery

See also 
Łazienkowski Bridge
Poniatowski Bridge

References

External links 

 
 Trasa Świętokrzyska
 Satellite image

Bridges completed in 2000
Bridges in Warsaw
Cable-stayed bridges in Poland
Road bridges in Poland